Red Scare is an American cultural commentary and humor podcast founded in March 2018 and hosted by Dasha Nekrasova and Anna Khachiyan.

The show has been associated with the dirtbag left as well as the subculture surrounding Dimes Square. It has been described in The Cut as "a critique of feminism, and capitalism, from deep inside the culture they've spawned."

Content 
Red Scare bills itself as a cultural commentary podcast hosted by "bohemian layabouts" Dasha Nekrasova and Anna Khachiyan, and is recorded from their homes in Lower Manhattan, New York City. Nekrasova is a Belarus-born actress, who became known as "Sailor Socialism" after an interview with an InfoWars reporter went viral in 2018. She immigrated to Las Vegas, Nevada, with her acrobat parents when she was four. Khachiyan is a Moscow-born writer, art critic and daughter of Armenian mathematician Leonid Khachiyan. She was raised in New Jersey. The two women met on Twitter, and started the podcast in March 2018 after Nekrasova relocated to New York City from Los Angeles.

Early episodes were produced by Meg Murnane, who also appeared as the show's third co-host. She made her last appearance on the show in October 2018, and episodes have been self-produced since then. On an episode released on December 5, 2018, Nekrasova and Khachiyan announced that they had parted ways with Murnane "amicably and mutually".

The show covers current topics in American culture and politics and is a critique of neoliberalism and feminism in a manner both comedic and serious in tone. The hosts are influenced by the work of Mark Fisher, Slavoj Žižek, Camille Paglia, Michel Houellebecq and Christopher Lasch. Recurring topics include Russiagate, the #MeToo movement, woke consumerism and call-out culture.

Several writers, artists, social commentators and cultural figures from across the political spectrum have appeared on Red Scare, including Elizabeth Bruenig, Angela Nagle, Tulsi Gabbard, Glenn Greenwald, Steve Bannon, Slavoj Žižek, Adam Curtis, Alex Jones and Curtis Yarvin. Nekrasova and Khachiyan have hosted several episodes of the show live, most notably broadcasting on NPR at The Green Space at WNYC and WQXR, as well as interviewing social media influencer Caroline Calloway at the Bell House in Brooklyn, and John Waters as part of NPCC fest. Khachiyan has been interviewed by Bret Easton Ellis and Eric Weinstein on their respective podcasts.

Format and availability 
An episode of Red Scare is typically between 50 and 90 minutes long. The show's theme song is "All the Things She Said", the 2002 single by Russian pop duo t.A.T.u. Weekly free episodes of the show are available via podcast hosting services such as Apple Podcasts and Spotify. Subscribers who contribute at least $5 per month via Patreon gain access to additional weekly premium bonus episodes. As of July 2022, the show has generated over $54,200 per month from over 12,100 subscribers.

Episode guide 
The show's most frequent guest is photographer Dan Allegretto at seven appearances, followed by Amber A'Lee Frost of Chapo Trap House at six appearances, writer Patrik Sandberg at five appearances and Glenn Greenwald at four appearances.

Reception and cultural impact
The hosts have been called "provocateurs", with a New York Times op-ed dismissing Red Scare as a "louche hipster podcast" for its "contempt for social liberalism" and a desire to "épater la bourgeoisie". Both hosts supported Bernie Sanders in the 2020 Democratic primaries, but later became disillusioned with both the political establishment and millennial leftist figures (such as Alexandria Ocasio-Cortez) for prioritizing identity politics over class. Nekrasova, a practicing Catholic who has expressed sedevacantist views, has been credited for trending Catholicism in certain demographics of millennials and zoomers.

In a 2022 Vanity Fair article, conservative filmmaker Amanda Milius described Red Scare'''s laissez-faire attitude as a "premier example" of the "live-and-let-live place" occupied by the "new right", and reported that Khachiyan had met with billionaire venture capitalist Peter Thiel and political candidate Blake Masters. Nekrasova and Khachiyan have rejected this characterisation and denied receiving any funding from Thiel.

In 2021, Sydney Sweeney confirmed that Red Scare was the inspiration for the characters she and Brittany O'Grady played in the HBO satirical drama series The White Lotus, created by Mike White. Sweeney listened to episodes of the show before filming scenes to get into character.

Audrey Gelman, Lena Dunham, Chloë Sevigny, Cazzie David, Leah McSweeney, Alex Ross Perry, Charli XCX, Rachel Comey and Elizabeth Olsen have mentioned listening to the show in interviews. Gelman's husband, Genius co-founder Ilan Zechory, was a co-host on Red Scare Roundup'', a podcast that recapped episodes of the show from May to November 2018.

References

External links 
 Red Scare fansite

2018 establishments in New York City
2018 podcast debuts
2010s in Manhattan
Audio podcasts
Comedy and humor podcasts
Lower Manhattan
Patreon creators
Political podcasts
American podcasts